Nyoma kyamburensis is a species of beetle in the family Cerambycidae. It was described by Adlbauer in 1998. It is known from Uganda.

References

Endemic fauna of Uganda
Desmiphorini
Beetles described in 1998